Mary Ann Browne House, also known as Oakley, Oakley Grove, Faulcon-Browne House, and Dr. LaFayette Browne House, is a historic plantation house located near Vaughan, Warren County, North Carolina.  It consists of a -story, Italianate style rear wing built about 1800, with a main block added about 1855. The main block is attributed to Warrenton builder Jacob W. Holt.  It is a two-story, three bay, single pile, Greek Revival / Italianate style frame block.  It has a low hipped roof and Tudor arched windows.

It was listed on the National Register of Historic Places in 1986.

References 

Plantation houses in North Carolina
Houses on the National Register of Historic Places in North Carolina
Greek Revival houses in North Carolina
Italianate architecture in North Carolina
Houses completed in 1855
Houses in Warren County, North Carolina
National Register of Historic Places in Warren County, North Carolina